Managazovo (Mänägäź) is a rural locality (a village) in Toshkurovsky Selsoviet, Baltachevsky District, Bashkortostan, Russia. The population was 87 as of 2010. There are 2 streets.

Geography 
Managazovo is located 14 km northeast of Starobaltachevo (the district's administrative centre) by road. Toshkurovo is the nearest rural locality.

References 

Rural localities in Baltachevsky District